The Barthelmarkt is an annual Volksfest (beer festival and travelling funfair) in Manching, near Ingolstadt, Germany. It is held on the last weekend of August and lasts four days. Every year, about 250,000 people visit it.

Though first mentioned in 1354, its roots can be traced back as early as to the 1st century BC, when the Romans established a cattle market in the area.

The name "Barthelmarkt" stems from St. Bartholomew, the patron saint of the local church.

Beer tents 
Herrnbräu Festzelt (Ingolstadt)
Toerring Bier Festzelt (Pörnbach)
Stiftl Spaten Festzelt (Munich)
Ingobräu Festzelt (Ingolstadt)
Weissbiergarten Mittl (Ingolstadt)

References

External links 
Barthelmarkt.com
 Donaukurier.de: Pictures, Videos, News, Maps and Programm

Beer festivals in Germany
Annual events in Germany